Interstate 80 (I-80) in the US state of Pennsylvania runs for  across the northern part of the state. It is designated as the Keystone Shortway and officially as the Z.H. Confair Memorial Highway. This route was built mainly along a completely new alignment, not paralleling any earlier US Routes, as a shortcut to the tolled Pennsylvania Turnpike to the south and New York State Thruway to the north. It does not serve any major cities in Pennsylvania and is mainly as a cross-state route on the Ohio–New York City corridor. Most of I-80's path across the state goes through hilly and mountainous terrain, while the route passes through relatively flat areas toward the western part of the state.

I-80 serves many smaller cities in central to northern Pennsylvania including Sharon, Clarion, DuBois,  Bellefonte, Lock Haven, Milton, Bloomsburg, Hazleton, and Stroudsburg. It also passes close but never into four slightly larger cities: Williamsport, State College, Scranton, and Wilkes-Barre.

Route description

Western Pennsylvania
From the state of Ohio, I-80 enters the Western Pennsylvania area which encompasses Mercer, Venango, Butler, Clarion, Jefferson, and Clearfield counties. This segment crosses the Allegheny Plateau. In Mercer County, I-80 intersects I-376 (serving Pittsburgh International Airport and Downtown Pittsburgh) in Shenango Township and I-79 (serving Erie to the north and Pittsburgh to the south) in Findley Township. It crosses the Allegheny River on the Emlenton Bridge near Emlenton.

Jefferson County at milemarker 73 is known for the city of Punxsutawney, the location of the famous groundhog Punxsutawney Phil who predicts the weather on Groundhog Day. In Clearfield County, I-80 passes by the city of DuBois at milemarker 101, and crosses the Eastern Continental Divide at a shallow ridge just east of that city.

East of exit 111, in Moshannon State Forest, I-80 reaches its highest elevation east of the Mississippi River, . A sign prominently displays this fact about the Interstate. It then descends to cross the West Branch Susquehanna River.

North-Central Pennsylvania
I-80 enters Centre County around milemarker 138. I-80 descends Allegheny Mountain into the Nittany Valley, intersecting I-99/U.S. Route 220 (US 220) at exit 161, the main connecting point to the Pennsylvania Turnpike (I-70/I-76), Pennsylvania State University, and State College. US 220 is concurrent between exits 161 and 178 where it heads toward Lock Haven, home to Lock Haven University of Pennsylvania.

I-80 then ascends Sugar Valley Mountain and then follows White Deer Creek down to the West Branch Susquehanna River, which I-80 crosses a second time. Around milemarker 191, Pennsylvania Route 880 (PA 880) follows a parallel alignment within the median between the eastbound and westbound lanes for a half-mile, an unusual arrangement in Pennsylvania. It is common to see horse-drawn carriages from the nearby Amish communities traveling this highway-within-a-highway.

At milemarker 199, I-80 approaches the Williamsport area in Lycoming County, where the venue of the Little League World Series is located, while passing through Union County. I-80 intersects US 15 at exit 210.

Northeastern Pennsylvania

I-80 enters the Northeastern Pennsylvania area to include points Northumberland County and east to New Jersey. I-80 intersects I-180 and PA 147 at exit 212. In Montour County at milemarker 224, it approaches the Bloomsburg area, home to Bloomsburg University of Pennsylvania, where it crosses the North Branch Susquehanna River. At exit 260, a connection can be made via I-81 to Harrisburg to the south and Wilkes-Barre and Syracuse, New York, to the north.

The highway continues east into the Pocono Mountains region, which is home to ski resort areas. I-80 intersects I-476 (Pennsylvania Turnpike Northeast Extension) at exit 277 in Carbon County for connections to Allentown and Philadelphia to the south. Exit 277 also serves PA 940 and Hickory Run State Park. Just east of I-476, I-80 crosses into Monroe County. Exit 284 connects to PA 115 near Blakeslee and Lake Harmony. Exit 293 is an interchange with I-380 near Pocono Pines for a connection to I-84 to New England and Scranton toward the north. Between exits 293 and 298, there is a rest area on the eastbound side with public restrooms and picnic tables but no food or gas.

Around exit 298, I-80 approaches the Stroudsburg and East Stroudsburg areas in the eastern Pocono Mountains, a more suburban and populated region home to East Stroudsburg University of Pennsylvania. Stroudsburg is also the county seat for Monroe County. PA 611 follows I-80 closely through the area between exits 298 and 310, acting as a local alternative. Exit 298 is only a westbound exit and eastbound entrance, connecting to PA 611 in Scotrun. Exit 299 serves PA 715 in Tannersville, as well as a local outlet mall. Exit 302 on the eastbound side and exit 304 on the westbound side connect to PA 33 and US 209, which connect to Easton and Allentown toward the south. Exit 302 in both directions also serves PA 611 in Bartonsville. I-80 and US 209 are concurrent with each other through most of Stroudsburg and East Stroudsburg, between exits 304 and 309. Exit 303 is an only eastbound exit and westbound entrance that connects to PA 611 (signed as Ninth Street), serving Arlington Heights. Exits 305, 306, and 307 all serve downtown Stroudsburg, with exit 305 serving US 209 Business and exit 307 serving PA 611 and PA 191, the three main local thoroughfares through the town. Exit 308 serves downtown East Stroudsburg and the East Stroudsburg University of Pennsylvania. I-80 splits with US 209 at exit 309, which also serves PA 447. Shortly after at exit 310 (the easternmost interchange in Pennsylvania), PA 611 intersects I-80 for the last time before starting its southerly route down the Delaware River, gradually moving away from I-80. I-80 continues east into the Delaware Water Gap, entering the state of New Jersey via the Delaware Water Gap Toll Bridge, with eastbound signage pointing toward New York City.

History

The corridor now served by I-80 was originally to be a branch of the Pennsylvania Turnpike from Sharon to Stroudsburg. Planning was shifted to the Pennsylvania Department of Highways in 1956 with the passage of the National Interstate and Defense Highways Act.

In early plans for the Interstate Highway System, the connection across Northern Pennsylvania would have paralleled US 6N and US 6 from what became I-90 near West Springfield east to Scranton. (East of Scranton, I-84 was built parallel to US 6.) From Scranton, a route went southeast along US 611 to the Stroudsburg area and then east along US 46 to near New York City. On May 22, 1957, a request by Pennsylvania to move the corridor south was approved by the Federal Highway Administration (FHWA). (The Scranton–Stroudsburg connection was kept, and the new alignment merged with it west of Stroudsburg.) However, when the initial numbers were assigned later that year, they were drawn on a 1947 map, and so the corridor across Northern Pennsylvania became part of I-84, while the Scranton–New York route became I-82. (I-80 ran along the Pennsylvania Turnpike to Harrisburg, where it split into I-80S to Philadelphia and I-80N to New York.) This was corrected the next year, as the Keystone Shortway became part of I-80, the turnpike west of Harrisburg became I-80S (later I-76), and I-80N became I-78. I-84 was truncated to Scranton, and the Scranton–Stroudsburg connection became I-81E (later renumbered I-380).

The first section of present I-80 to open was the Delaware Water Gap Toll Bridge, opened December 16, 1953. This had been built as part of US 611 and connected back to its old alignment soon after crossing into Pennsylvania. Construction on the rest of I-80 began in 1959 and was completed in 1970.

In 1993, exit 43 (now exit 284) of I-80, which serves the Pocono Raceway, was designated the Richard Petty Interchange in honor of the NASCAR driver that drove the #43 car.

On March 7, 2011, the supporting wall on the eastbound I-80 bridge over Sullivan Trail in Tannersville collapsed from snow and rain. As a result, eastbound I-80 was reduced to one lane and Sullivan Trail was closed.

On July 10, 2014, a criminal rock throwing incident known as the I-80 rock throwing took place along I-80 in Union County, critically injuring and permanently disfiguring a passenger. Four local youths were responsible.

On December 18, 2020, a snow squall caused an accident on this highway that generated a massive pileup of 66 vehicles (mainly trucks). One person was killed on the scene and at least 43 others were injured. One other person later died from injuries. Eastbound lanes in Clinton County were closed due to the accident and Governor Tom Wolf and the Pennsylvania Department of Transportation (PennDOT) held a press conference discussing the accident.

Toll proposal

In response to Act 44, which requires the Pennsylvania Turnpike Commission (PTC) to provide funding to PennDOT for transportation projects, in June 2007, the PTC proposed tolling I-80 as a means of raising revenue. It sought the permission to put tolls on the highway through an FHWA pilot program that allowed three states to place tolls on Interstates. Missouri and Virginia had already taken two of the spots. Under the plan, the PTC would assume all maintenance and toll-taking operations on I-80. Currently, the only toll on I-80 in Pennsylvania is the westbound toll at the Delaware Water Gap Toll Bridge between Pennsylvania and New Jersey. On October 15, 2007, the lease for the PTC to toll I-80 was signed, and tolls were to be implemented by 2010. 

This plan faced opposition from Northern Pennsylvania politicians who feared tolls would hurt the economy in the region and who did not want their tolls going toward funding mass transit. Representatives John E. Peterson and Phil English proposed a federal transportation bill that would ban the tolling of I-80. The chief executive officer of the PTC promised that the tolls would be used on highway projects in Pennsylvania and not on mass transit. On December 12, 2007, the FHWA rejected the plan and returned Pennsylvania's application for tolling I-80 with "fourteen items identified as insufficient by the FHWA", including a statement that revenue from tolls on I-80 was proposed to be used for purposes other than maintenance of I-80, contrary to the FHWA program requirements.

On September 11, 2008, the FHWA rejected Pennsylvania's application to toll I-80 a second time, stating: "There is simply no evidence that the lease payments [by the Turnpike Authority] are related to the actual costs of acquiring an interest in the facility." On April 6, 2010, the FHWA rejected the application for the third time, with the statement: "We based today's decision on what is allowable under federal law. The Interstate System Reconstruction and Rehabilitation Pilot Program requires that revenue from tolls be used only to improve the tolled facility, in this case I-80, and not be directed toward other state funding needs or transportation projects elsewhere in the state, as is the case in the Pennsylvania application."

Future

I-99 interchange
PennDOT has plans to build a high-speed interchange connecting I-99 to I-80 near Bellefonte. The new interchange will eliminate local access between PA 26 (Jacksonville Road) and I-80, which will be provided by a new exit  to the east. The first phase of the project built the local access interchange between PA 26 and I-80. Construction on the local access interchange began on July 27, 2020. The local access interchange was opened to traffic on November 10, 2022, with a ribbon-cutting ceremony held. The local access interchange between PA 26 and I-80 was funded in part by a $35-million federal grant, with a total estimated cost of $52 million. The second phase of the project will make improvements to Jacksonville Road between the new interchange and the junction between I-80, and the third phase will build the high-speed interchange between I-80 and I-99. Bidding on the second and third phases is planned to begin in March 2022, with the improvements to Jacksonville Road to be finished by December 2023 and the high-speed interchange to be completed by December 2025.

Stroudsburg widening

Due to increasing suburbanization and a rapidly increasing population in the Stroudsburg area, I-80 is to be widened to three lanes in each direction from its current two between I-380 (exit 293) in Pocono Pines and the Delaware Water Gap Bridge (New Jersey state line). The project had a completion date of 2023, has been approved by PennDOT and the US Department of Transportation (USDOT), and is in the final design phase. The project will widen I-80 to three lanes in each direction between exit 298 and exit 308, as well as reconstruct all interchanges included in this part of the project. This section of road was built in the 1950s and is one of the oldest stretches of Interstate Highway in the US, starting out as a simple bypass of Stroudsburg for US 209 before becoming part of I-80. It has one of the highest accident rates in Pennsylvania due to major issues such as most entrances not having acceleration lanes, multiple overpasses that are structurally deficient, and shoulders that are as narrow as a tenth the required length for Interstate Highways. Exits 304 and 305 on the westbound side are close together that they are only a half of the length apart required between exits, according to Interstate standards. Exits 298, 303, and 306 all do not provide full access. I-80 is a designated route so that the lanes have to be open during construction. In addition, this stretch of highway has large local usage, with 48 percent of drivers that enter at exit 307 getting off at either exit 306, 305, or 304 so most of the current connections must be preserved to prevent local opposition. 

All of the details of the project include widening I-80 to three lanes in each direction between exit 298 and exit 308 and rebuilding exits 298, 303, 306, 307, and 308. Exits 307 and 308 will both be reconstructed, and no minor improvements allowed.

Exit list

See also

References

External links

 Pennsylvania Highways: Interstate 80
 I-80 at AARoads.com
 Pennsylvania Roads - I-80

80
 Pennsylvania
Transportation in Mercer County, Pennsylvania
Transportation in Venango County, Pennsylvania
Transportation in Butler County, Pennsylvania
Transportation in Clarion County, Pennsylvania
Transportation in Jefferson County, Pennsylvania
Transportation in Clearfield County, Pennsylvania
Transportation in Centre County, Pennsylvania
Transportation in Clinton County, Pennsylvania
Transportation in Union County, Pennsylvania
Transportation in Northumberland County, Pennsylvania
Transportation in Montour County, Pennsylvania
Transportation in Columbia County, Pennsylvania
Transportation in Luzerne County, Pennsylvania
Transportation in Carbon County, Pennsylvania
Transportation in Monroe County, Pennsylvania